David Franklin Eaton (born 30 September 1981) is an English former professional footballer who played as a forward in the Football League for Macclesfield Town. He was on the books of Everton without playing for their first team, and also played non-league football for clubs including Witton Albion, Stafford Rangers, Burscough, Leigh RMI, Marine, Skelmersdale United, Bamber Bridge and A.F.C. Liverpool.

References

External links
 

1981 births
Living people
Footballers from Liverpool
English footballers
Association football forwards
Everton F.C. players
Macclesfield Town F.C. players
Witton Albion F.C. players
Stafford Rangers F.C. players
Burscough F.C. players
Leigh Genesis F.C. players
Marine F.C. players
Skelmersdale United F.C. players
Bamber Bridge F.C. players
A.F.C. Liverpool players
English Football League players
Northern Premier League players
National League (English football) players
North West Counties Football League players